Rhinolekos garavelloi is a species of catfish in the family Loricariidae. It is native to South America, where it occurs in the Paranaíba River basin in the upper Paraná River system in the state of Goiás in Brazil. The species reaches 3.6 cm (1.4 inches) in standard length. Its specific name, garavelloi, honors Julio C. Garavello of the Federal University of São Carlos for his contributions to the ichthyology of the Neotropical realm.

References 

Loricariidae
Fish described in 2011
Catfish of South America
Freshwater fish of Brazil